Ulnar tunnel syndrome, also known as Guyon's canal syndrome or Handlebar palsy, is caused by entrapment of the ulnar nerve in the Guyon canal as it passes through the wrist.  Symptoms usually begin with a feeling of pins and needles in the ring and little fingers before progressing to a loss of sensation and/or impaired motor function of the intrinsic muscles of the hand which are innervated by the ulnar nerve. Ulnar tunnel syndrome is commonly seen in regular cyclists due to prolonged pressure of the Guyon's canal against bicycle handlebars.  Another very common cause of sensory loss in the ring and pink finger is due to ulnar nerve entrapment at the cubital tunnel near the elbow, which is known as cubital tunnel syndrome.

Causes
While being idiopathic in some cases, causative factors of the ulnar tunnel syndrome include tumors, ganglion cysts, repetitive use, anatomical variations, and diseases of the neighboring blood vessels (thrombosis or aneurysm of the ulnar artery).

Diagnosis

Classification 

Ulnar tunnel syndrome may be characterized by the location or zone within the Guyon's canal at which the ulnar nerve is compressed. The nerve divides into a superficial sensory branch and a deeper motor branch in this area. Thus, Guyon's canal can be separated into three zones based on which portion of the ulnar nerve are involved. The resulting syndrome results in either muscle weakness or impaired sensation in the ulnar distribution.

Zone 2 type syndromes are most common, while Zone 3 are least common.

Treatment 
Initial line of treatment is with anti-inflammatory drugs or cortisone injections. There have been trials with gloves which help protect the ulnar nerve from compression. The most radical treatment option is surgery to relieve tension in the volar carpal ligament which forms the roof of Guyon's canal, thereby reducing compression on the ulnar nerve.

See also
 Cubital tunnel syndrome
 Jean Casimir Félix Guyon
 Ulnar claw

References

Further reading
 
 
 
 
 

Musculoskeletal disorders
Syndromes affecting the nervous system